Dobiesław - is an old Polish given name of Slavic origin built of two parts: dobie - "appropriate, brave" and sława - "glory, fame". Feminine form is: Dobiesława.
The name may refer to:

People

 Dobiesław Kmita, a Polish nobleman, Lublin Voivode
 Dobiesław "Lubelczyk" Kurozwęcki, a Polish nobleman, the Palatine of Lublin

Places

Dobiesław, Gryfice County, a settlement in West Pomeranian Voivodeship in north-western Poland
Dobiesław, Sławno County, a village in West Pomeranian Voivodeship in north-western Poland
Dobiesławice, Kuyavian-Pomeranian Voivodeship, a village Kuyavian-Pomeranian Voivodeship in north-central Poland
Dobiesław-Kolonia, a settlement in West Pomeranian Voivodeship, in north-western Poland

See also

 Slavic names

Polish masculine given names
Slavic masculine given names